Riverside (Māori: Ōruku) is a suburb of Whangārei, in Northland Region, New Zealand. It is east of the city centre, across the Hātea River.

Pohe Island is a 54 square kilometre open space which is adjacent to the mouth of the Hātea River and Whangārei Harbour. 
it contains William Fraser Memorial Park. William Mackenzie Fraser, for whom the park is named, was an engineer for Whangarei County from 1907 to 1918, held various positions with the Whangarei Harbour Board from 1920 until 1947, and was a County Council member from 1947 until his death in 1960.

Demographics

Riverside had a population of 2,085 at the 2018 New Zealand census, an increase of 294 people (16.4%) since the 2013 census, and an increase of 138 people (7.1%) since the 2006 census. There were 813 households, comprising 1,032 males and 1,053 females, giving a sex ratio of 0.98 males per female. The median age was 43.1 years (compared with 37.4 years nationally), with 360 people (17.3%) aged under 15 years, 393 (18.8%) aged 15 to 29, 951 (45.6%) aged 30 to 64, and 381 (18.3%) aged 65 or older.

Ethnicities were 82.2% European/Pākehā, 27.9% Māori, 4.0% Pacific peoples, 3.5% Asian, and 2.0% other ethnicities. People may identify with more than one ethnicity.

The percentage of people born overseas was 19.6, compared with 27.1% nationally.

Although some people chose not to answer the census's question about religious affiliation, 54.7% had no religion, 32.5% were Christian, 1.7% had Māori religious beliefs, 0.4% were Hindu, 0.1% were Muslim, 0.6% were Buddhist and 2.0% had other religions.

Of those at least 15 years old, 321 (18.6%) people had a bachelor's or higher degree, and 261 (15.1%) people had no formal qualifications. The median income was $33,500, compared with $31,800 nationally. 264 people (15.3%) earned over $70,000 compared to 17.2% nationally. The employment status of those at least 15 was that 891 (51.7%) people were employed full-time, 252 (14.6%) were part-time, and 63 (3.7%) were unemployed.

Notes

Populated places in the Northland Region
Suburbs of Whangārei